Temnikovsky (masculine), Temnikovskaya (feminine), or Temnikovskoye (neuter) may refer to:
Temnikovsky District, a district of the Republic of Mordovia, Russia
Temnikovskoye Urban Settlement, a municipal formation which the town of district significance of Temnikov in Temnikovsky District of the Republic of Mordovia, Russia is incorporated as
Temnikovsky ITL, or Temlag, one of the Soviet GULAG labor camps